The Wings Club, also known as the Wings Club of New York, is a social and professional club formed for aviators, based in New York City. Founded in 1942 by a group of American aviation pioneers, it is known for its monthly lunches, annual dinners and special occasions at which talks are given on various aspects of aviation. The club gives out scholarships to aviation students, and selects individuals and organizations for recognition with the "Distinguished Achievement Award".

History
The Wings Club was founded in New York City on May 15, 1942. It was housed within the Yale Club and served World War II pilots as a place of leisure and occasional living quarters. The first board of directors included Juan Trippe, the founder of Pan American World Airways, and World War I flying ace Eddie Rickenbacker. The first president was Caleb Bragg, a racer of automobiles and speedboats, aviation pioneer, and automotive inventor. Bragg had previously been a governor of the Aero Club of America. He was made president of the Wings Club despite suffering from a longterm illness which led to his death later the next year.

The club grew quickly to 500 members in its first year, then to 1,000 by the end of its second year. In the 1970s there were 1,500 members, including women for the first time. By 2011, membership had decreased to about 1,200. Members met at the Yale Club in the first few years, then in April 1946 the Wings Club relocated to the Biltmore Hotel where it stayed for 37 years. The Biltmore was torn down in 1981, so the club moved to nearby 52 Vanderbilt Avenue, a 20-story building opposite Grand Central Terminal. The Wings Club maintained a library, kitchen and dining hall on the 18th floor until 2002 when they stopped keeping their own quarters and instead met only at the Yale Club. In 2011, the club again moved into a permanent home, consisting of offices and a boardroom inside the MetLife Building, formerly the headquarters of Pan Am.

Activities
Many notable aviators have delivered speeches at lunches and dinners hosted by the Wings Club. The first lunch talk was delivered by Gill Robb Wilson, the president of the National Aeronautic Association and an invited guest of the Wings Club. This event was so well received that it was used as the template for monthly lunch speeches. The first annual dinner speech was presented by founding club member Eddie Rickenbacker on March 22, 1944.

Following the record-breaking 1945 Japan–Washington flight made by three U.S. Army Air Force generals in Boeing B-29 Superfortresses, the generals and their crews were invited to a Wings Club dinner held in their honor at the Yale Club. B-29 generals Curtis LeMay and Emmett O'Donnell Jr were able to attend, as were other USAAF generals such as Carl Andrew Spaatz and Jimmy Doolittle.

In early 1964, Joseph A. Walker, the chief test pilot for NASA, spoke about NASA's space program, especially about the Lunar Landing Research Vehicle for which he served as project manager. Walker expressed great confidence in the likelihood of a successful moon landing but he died two years later in an air collision and never saw the program to completion.

Also in 1964, founding club member, former club president and retired USAF General Harold Ross Harris implemented the annual "Sight Lecture" series at which a leading aviation notable was to be invited to deliver a lecture adhering generally to "insights, foresights and hindsights" of aviation. Each lecture was to be published in book form by the Wings Club. 

Beginning in 1975, the Wings Club selects one or more organizations or individuals each year to be honored with the "Distinguished Achievement Award", conferred at the annual dinner in October. The first awardee was aviation pioneer and USAF General Jimmy Doolittle.

Beginning in 2010, the Wings Club began to recognize organizations or individuals each year to be honored with the "Outstanding Aviator Award", presented at the annual meeting in March. The first recipients were the Tuskegee Airmen, the first African American pilots to serve in the US Army Air Corps. during World War II. 

Since 2000, the club has awarded scholarships to aviation and aerospace students, beginning with Maurice Stanley who was studying aviation management at Dowling College, Long Island, New York.

Guest speakers
 (1943) Gill Robb Wilson, President of the National Aeronautic Association
 (March 19, 1946) Carl Andrew Spaatz, "Future Use of Air Power"
 (1947) Dwight D. Eisenhower
 (January 18, 1956) Henri Coandă, describing his early jet experiment, the Coandă-1910
 Bernt Balchen
 Alan Shepard
 Jimmy Doolittle
 Grover Loening
 Vincent Bendix
 Jerome Lederer
 Wernher von Braun
 (April 22, 1981) Senator Barry Goldwater
 (May 18, 1988) Neil A. Armstrong

Notable members

 Gordon Bethune
 Caleb Bragg
 Robert Crandall
 Herb Kelleher
 Eddie Rickenbacker
 C. R. Smith
 Frederick W. Smith
 Juan Trippe

Honorary members

 Henry H. Arnold
 Jerome Clarke Hunsaker
 Fiorello LaGuardia
 L. Welch Pogue

Sight Lecture Series
Some notable Sight Lectures include:
 The first Sight Lecture was delivered by Igor Sikorsky on November 16, 1964, under the title "Recollections and Thoughts of a Pioneer". Sikorsky spoke primarily about the future role of the helicopter; he was certain that it would remain an important type of aircraft despite experiments with VTOL fixed-wing designs. 
 The 5th Sight Lecture was delivered on May 15, 1968 by Dr. Wernher von Braun. His topic was "Space Flight Past, Present, and Future".
 Senator Barry Goldwater, a former military ferry pilot and an avid private pilot, delivered a Sight Lecture in 1981 titled "The state of our industry and raw materials in relation to defense." 
 In 1984, the lectures were renamed the "General Harold R. Harris 'Sight' Lecture" in honor of his contributions to the Wings Club, serving as club president in 1958/59 and conceiving the Sight Lectures. On May 16, 1984, General Harris presented the 21st Sight Lecture: "The First 80 Years".
 The 25th Sight Lecture in 1988 was delivered by Astronaut Neil A. Armstrong on May 18, 1988. His lecture was titled "Wingless on Luna", in which he hoped "to give some insights into the history and unique problems confronted in developing methods for flying a machine over the lunar surface".
 Joseph F. Sutter of The Boeing Company is the only two-time presenter (as of 2016). His 1986 lecture was titled "Changing Scene in the U.S. Air Transportation System", and in 2007 he presented "The Boeing 747: Definition of a Champion".
 Frederick W. "Fred" Smith, the founder of FedEx, is scheduled to deliver a Sight Lecture in May 2012.

A complete list of speakers, topics and dates collected from the published volumes of Sight Lecture Series is summarized in the table below. Note: there is some ambiguity regarding lectures and numbering from 1997-2009.

See also
 Order of Daedalians
 Quiet Birdmen

References

Flying clubs
Organizations established in 1942
1942 establishments in New York City